Beware of The Dogs is the second album released by rap group, The Dogs. It was released on June 4, 1991 through Joey Boy Records and was produced by Disco Rick. The album was less successful than the group's previous album, having peaked at #55 on the Top R&B/Hip-Hop Albums chart.

Track listing
"Intro"- 0:44 
"Talking True Shit"- 4:28 
"Radio"- 4:28 
"Get Down"- 3:46 
"Fuck All Night"- 4:23 
"Life About Crack"- 2:46 
"Sexy's Got Beef"- 3:53 
"Nasty Dance"- 3:21 
"Work That Ass Baby"- 3:18 
"Got That Spirit"- 3:25 
"I Know a Bitch"- 3:15 
"Hyped Up"- 2:18 
"Dogga Mix"- 3:33 
"Fuck You All"- 2:27

1991 albums
The Dogs albums